Don Republic provided the following units to the Don Army and Volunteer Army during the Russian Civil War. After the revolution and the collapse of the front most Don officers and Cossack's returned to their lands of the Don. Most of the Cossacks were outspoken opponents of the Bolsheviks. At the first opportunity, they formed a partisan detachment. In its first stages, the Don Army was under the leadership of the Don Ataman Full General Alexey Kaledin who led the Don Cossack Whites before he died on January 29, 1918, at Novocherkassk

First Don Army

Infantry

Cavalry
 1st Cossack Volunteer Cavalry Regiment of Alexei V. Kravtzov
 2nd Cossack Volunteer Cavalry Regiment of Petr H. Popov (:ru:Попов, Пётр Харитонович)
 3rd Cossack Volunteer Cavalry Regiment of Alexander P. Fitzhelaurov (:ru:Фицхелауров, Александр Петрович)
 4th Cossack Volunteer Cavalry Regiment of Alexander V. Golubintzev
 Colonel Tchernetzov's Partisan Company of Vasily Tchernetzov

Artillery

2nd stage – After reorganization of the Don Army in August 1919 under command of Generals Krasnov and Bogaewsky

1st Don Army Corps

Infantry
 6th Don Division (6-я Донская пластунская дивизия)
 3rd Don Brigade (3-я Донская пластунская бригада)
 4th Don Brigade (4-я Донская пластунская бригада)

Artillery

Cavalry
 10th Don Cavalry Brigade
 14th Don Cavalry Brigade

2nd Don Army Corps

Infantry

Artillery

Cavalry

3rd Don Army Corps

Infantry

Artillery

Cavalry

4th Independent Don Army Corps

Cavalry
 9th Don Cavalry Division
 10rd Don Cavalry Division
 9th Don Cavalry Brigade
 13th Don Cavalry Brigade

External links 
Volkov S.V.: White movement in Russia: Organisation and structure. 2000

Military units and formations of the Russian Civil War
History of the Don Cossacks